The 1936 Baltic Cup was held in Riga, Latvia on 20–22 August 1935. It was the eighth time three Baltic states — Estonia, Latvia and Lithuania — came together to play a friendly tournament and determine the best team amongst them. Latvia won the tournament beating both opponents 2–1.

Results

Statistics

Goalscorers

See also
Balkan Cup
Nordic Football Championship

References

External links
 Tournament overview at EU-Football.info

1935
1936–37 in European football
1936 in Lithuanian football
1936 in Latvian football
1936 in Estonian football
1936